Alfredo Striani (born 7 April 1967) is an Italian lightweight rower. He won a gold medal at the 1987 World Rowing Championships in Copenhagen with the lightweight men's eight.

References

1967 births
Living people
Italian male rowers
World Rowing Championships medalists for Italy